The Andrews Journal was an American community newspaper based in Andrews, North Carolina, covering the regions of Andrews, Marble, Nantahala and Topton. It merged with the Cherokee Scout on January 1, 2019.

The journal
The Andrews Journal was published Thursdays. The journal provided information on local news and events like schools, town and county meetings, sports, weddings, engagements, birth announcements, business, entertainment, churches, clubs and community events. Much of the community news in the journal was submitted by the general public.

Publishers
The Andrews Journal was published by Community Newspapers, Inc. (CNI), Athens, Georgia.

External links

References

Defunct newspapers published in North Carolina
1965 establishments in North Carolina